Jefferson County is a county in the Coastal Plain or Gulf Prairie region of Southeast Texas. The Neches River forms its northeast boundary. As of the 2020 census, the population was 256,526. The county seat is Beaumont.  Jefferson County has the highest percentage of African Americans in the state of Texas.

The county was established in 1835 as a municipality of Mexico, which had gained independence from Spain. Because the area was lightly settled, the Mexican government allowed European Americans from the United States to settle here if they pledged loyalty to Mexico. This was organized as a county in 1837 after Texas achieved independence as a republic. It was named by European-American settlers for U.S. president Thomas Jefferson. Texas later became part of the US.

Jefferson County is part of the Beaumont–Port Arthur Metropolitan Statistical Area and has the highest population of the four-county MSA. It has three state correctional facilities and a federal high-security prison in unincorporated areas of the county. Together they have a maximum capacity of nearly 9,000 prisoners.

Geography 

Jefferson County is on the plains of the Texas Gulf Coast in the southeastern part of the state. It is bounded on the north by Pine Island Bayou, on the northeast by the Neches River, and on the east by Sabine Lake and the mouth of the Sabine River, a natural outlet called Sabine Pass. The southern part of the county is largely marshland, much of which is within Sea Rim State Park, reaching the storm-battered beach at the Gulf of Mexico.

Major highways 
  Interstate 10
    U.S. Highway 69/U.S. Highway 96/U.S. Highway 287
  U.S. Highway 90
  State Highway 73
  State Highway 82
  State Highway 87
  State Highway 105
  State Highway 124
  State Highway 326
  State Highway 347

Adjacent counties and parishes 
 Hardin County (north)
 Orange County (northeast)
 Chambers County (southwest)
 Liberty County (northwest)
 Cameron Parish, Louisiana (east)

National protected areas 
 Big Thicket National Preserve (part)
 McFaddin National Wildlife Refuge
 Texas Point National Wildlife Refuge

Communities

Cities 

 Beaumont (county seat)
 Bevil Oaks
 China
 Groves
 Nederland
 Nome
 Port Arthur (small part in Orange County)
 Port Neches
 Taylor Landing

Census-designated places 
 Beauxart Gardens
 Central Gardens
 Fannett
 Hamshire

Unincorporated places
 Cheek
 Dowling
 LaBelle
 Viterbo

Demographics

Note: the US Census treats Hispanic/Latino as an ethnic category. This table excludes Latinos from the racial categories and assigns them to a separate category. Hispanics/Latinos can be of any race.

As of the census of 2000, there were 252,051 people, 92,880 households, and 63,808 families residing in the county.  The population density was 279 people per square mile (108/km2).  There were 102,080 housing units at an average density of 113 per square mile (44/km2).  The racial makeup of the county was 57.24% White, 33.74% Black or African American, 0.34% Native American, 2.89% Asian, 0.03% Pacific Islander, 4.26% from other races, and 1.50% from two or more races. 10.53% of the population were Hispanic or Latino of any race. 8.3% were of American, 7.2% French, 6.2% German, 5.8% English and 5.3% Irish ancestry according to census 2000.

There were 92,880 households, out of which 33.00% had children under the age of 18 living with them, 48.40% were married couples living together, 16.20% had a female householder with no husband present, and 31.30% were non-families. 27.30% of all households were made up of individuals, and 11.00% had someone living alone who was 65 years of age or older.  The average household size was 2.55 and the average family size was 3.12.

In the county, the population was spread out, with 25.90% under the age of 18, 10.00% from 18 to 24, 29.30% from 25 to 44, 21.10% from 45 to 64, and 13.60% who were 65 years of age or older.  The median age was 35 years. For every 100 females, there were 101.10 males.  For every 100 females age 18 and over, there were 100.20 males.

The median income for a household in the county was $34,706, and the median income for a family was $42,290. Males had a median income of $36,719 versus $23,924 for females. The per capita income for the county was $17,571.  About 14.60% of families and 17.40% of the population were below the poverty line, including 24.60% of those under age 18 and 11.80% of those age 65 or over.

Government and politics

County
The County Commissioners Court, considered the administrative arm of the state government, is made up of a county judge and four commissioners. The four commissioners are elected to staggered terms from single-member districts or precincts, two in years of presidential elections and two in off-years. The County Commissioners Court carries out the "budgetary and policy making functions of county government. In addition, in many counties, commissioners have extensive responsibilities related to the building and maintenance of county roads."

The elected county judge in Texas may also be the judge of the County Criminal Court, County Civil Court, Probate Court and Juvenile Court.

State 
Jefferson County was represented in Texas State House District 21 from 1999 to 2015 in the Texas House of Representatives by the Republican Allan Ritter, a businessman from Nederland. On January 13, 2015, Republican Dade Phelan of Beaumont succeeded Ritter, who did not seek reelection in 2014.

It is also represented in Texas State House District 22, which takes in much of Beaumont and Port Arthur, by Democrat Joe D. Deshotel, who has served in this seat since 1999. In the 81st Legislative Session, Deshotel was appointed to serve as chairman of the House Business and Industry Committee, a post he continues to hold today.

The Texas Department of Criminal Justice operates three facilities in the county: the Gist Unit, a state jail; the Stiles Unit, a prison; and the Leblanc Unit, a pre-release facility, in an unincorporated area of Jefferson County.

In addition, the Texas Youth Commission operated the Al Price State Juvenile Correctional Facility in an unincorporated area within the Mid County region. The facility was among three selected for closure on August 31, 2011, because of agency budget shortfalls. In 2015 the county commissioners announced that it would lease the facility to a Beaumont charter school, Evolution Academy, at a minimal cost for 35 years. This was reported as an attempt to prevent the state from housing sex offenders here who had completed their sentences.

Federal
Jefferson County is part of Texas's 14th congressional district, represented in the US House of Representatives by Randy Weber (Republican). The Texas US Senators are John Cornyn (Republican) and Ted Cruz (Republican).

The Federal Bureau of Prisons operates the Beaumont Federal Correctional Complex in an unincorporated area in Jefferson County. It is a high-security prison with a capacity of nearly 1400 inmates.

Presidential elections
Membership in political parties in Texas has undergone realignment since the late 20th century, following passage of the Voting Rights Act of 1965 and renewed participation by minorities in the political system. Jefferson County has been dominated by Democratic voters in presidential elections: prior to 1965 they were majority white and the party has since attracted many minorities. In many parts of Texas, Republican voters have predominated in presidential elections, especially since the turn of the 21st century.

In 2004, Jefferson was one of only 18 counties in Texas that gave Senator John Kerry a majority of the popular vote. Kerry received 47,050 votes while George W. Bush received 44,412. In 2008, Barack Obama won 51.25% of the vote. John McCain won 48.38% of the vote. Other candidates received 1% of the vote.
The Democratic trend continued in 2012 when Barack Obama won Jefferson County with 50.34% of the vote, while 48.73% went to Mitt Romney.

In 2016, Donald Trump won the county by a very narrow margin over Hillary Clinton, becoming the first Republican presidential candidate to win in Jefferson County since 1972.  Trump carried the county again in 2020, this time with a majority. Jefferson County has swung towards the Republican Party in every presidential election since 1992.

Economy 

The area is served by deep-water ports located at Beaumont, Port Arthur, Orange, and Sabine Pass.  The Sabine Neches Waterway provides deep-water access to ocean-going vessels, which are served by public ports within the county.  The waterway is the 8th largest port in the US by tonnage.

The county is traversed by Interstate Highway 10, US Highways 90 and 69-96-287, State Highways 73, 87, and 105 and three farm-to-market roads.  Rail and motor freight carriers also provide freight service to the county.  The Jack Brooks Regional Airport located between Beaumont and Port Arthur provides passenger and freight service and is currently serviced by one commuter passenger air carrier.

The economy of the county is based primarily on petroleum refining; the production and processing of petrochemicals, bio-fuels and other chemicals; the fabrication of steel and steel products; shipping activity; the manufacture of wood, pulp, food and feed products; agriculture; and health care services.  The county continues to diversify its economic base as evidenced by the increase of jobs in the services and government sectors.  The county is also home to the largest military off-load port in the world.

Several large projects are in construction, permitting, and development for the area and the county continues to work with other taxing entities to create a business environment conducive to this growth.  These include such notables as Lucite, Air Products, Vitol, Golden Pass Products, OCI, Exxon Mobil, Golden Pass LNG, and Sempra Energy.

Petrochemical expansions at the Motiva, Total, and Valero facilities located in Jefferson County represent approximately $15 billion in project improvements.  In addition, hundreds of millions of dollars are being spent on terminal and pipeline facilities to support these projects.  Construction of the Trans-Canada Keystone XL pipeline which would deliver Canadian tar sands crude to Jefferson County and proponents say would help in relieving US dependence on oil from more politically volatile regions is awaiting federal permit approval.  In addition, recent rail terminal facility expansions and new construction has significantly increased the transportation of Canadian tar sands oil and bitumen to the area for processing by area refineries.

Cheniere, one of two companies with Liquefied Natural Gas Terminals on the border of the Texas/Louisiana Coast, is completing construction of a $10 billion liquefaction facility.  Golden Pass LNG opened their terminal in mid-2011.  With their opening, the ship channel is now home to over 40% of the nation's LNG capacity.  Golden Pass LNG has filed with federal authorities for permits allowing it to build a $10 billion gas liquefaction facility in Jefferson County, as has Sempra Energy.  It is anticipated that these permits should move through the approval process more expeditiously now that former Texas governor Rick Perry has been confirmed as the new Secretary of Energy.

The county has participated in a study by the U.S. Army Corps of Engineers into the feasibility of deepening the Sabine-Neches waterway.  This will allow ports in Southeast Texas, the third largest in the nation, to accommodate newer deep draft vessels and thus remain competitive with other ports on the Gulf Coast.  Recently, the U.S. Army Corps of Engineers issued their “Chief’s Report” which paves the way for federal funding of this project.  The U S House and Senate recently passed legislation which was signed by the President authorizing the construction of the waterway improvements at a cost in excess of $1 billion.  Congressional appropriations for the project are expected shortly.

The county continues to work with industry leaders, the Texas Workforce Commission, Lamar Institute of Technology, Lamar University and non-profit groups to supply a workforce able to handle the growing labor needs of the county.  This is especially critical given the interest of the international community in locating facilities to the county.

The resurgence in U. S. oil and gas exploration and production has made the county the place of choice for those industrial sectors seeking to exploit opportunities to profit from historically low priced energy commodities.

Education 

School districts:
 Beaumont Independent School District
 Hamshire-Fannett Independent School District
 Hardin-Jefferson Independent School District
 Nederland Independent School District
 Port Arthur Independent School District
 Port Neches–Groves Independent School District
 Sabine Pass Independent School District

Hamshire-Fannett and Sabine Pass ISDs are assigned to Galveston College in Galveston. Legislation does not specify a community college for the remainder of the county.

Beaumont is home to Lamar University, a public research university with an enrollment of 14,889 students as of the fall 2014 semester; it offers 96 undergraduate, 50 master's, and eight doctoral degree programs.  Port Arthur is home to Lamar State College–Port Arthur, offering two-year degrees and one-year certifications, including 34 associate degrees and 24 technical programs.  Fall 2014 enrollment totaled 2,075 students.

See also 

 National Register of Historic Places listings in Jefferson County, Texas
 Recorded Texas Historic Landmarks in Jefferson County

References

External links 
 Jefferson County government's website
 Jefferson County in Handbook of Texas Online at the University of Texas

 
Texas counties
1837 establishments in the Republic of Texas
Beaumont–Port Arthur metropolitan area
Black Belt (U.S. region)
Populated places established in 1837
Majority-minority counties in Texas